Johann Georg Melchior Schmidtner (1625 - 1705) was a German Baroque painter. 

He became a pupil of the painter Johann Heinrich Schönfeld, and spent 15 years in Italy. Schmidtner is known for his altarpieces in churches near his home in Augsburg.

Works 
 Die Sieben Geschenke des Heiligen Geistes (1685; Augsburg, Schaezlerpalais)
 Aufnahme des Hl. Martin in den Himmel (1690; Hauptaltarbild von St. Martin in Lamerdingen)
 Kreuzabnahme Christi (1685; Hauptaltarbild von St. Wolfgang in Mickhausen) 
 Maria Knotenlöserin (1687; Augsburg, St. Peter am Perlach)

Literature 
 Claudia Madel: Die Nachfolge Johann Heinrich Schönfelds unter besonderer Berücksichtigung der Maler Johann Georg Melchior Schmidtner und Johann Georg Knappich, 1987 (Dissertation); Findhinweis
 Denis André Chevalley: Der Dom zu Augsburg, Band 1 von Kunstdenkmäler von Bayern, Oldenbourg Verlag, 1995, Seite 526, 
 Sibylle Appuhn-Radtke: Visuelle Medien im Dienst der Gesellschaft Jesu, Schnell und Steiner, 2000, Seiten 156 und 157, ; Ausschnitte aus der Quelle
 Peter Stoll: Darstellungen des hl. Martin aus dem Umkreis von Johann Heinrich Schönfeld in Jengen und Langenneufnach. Universitätsbibliothek, Augsburg 2014 Volltext

References

External links 

 Webseite zum Gnadenbild Maria Knotenlöserin, mit Erwähnung des Malers
 Webseite zum Gnadenbild Maria Knotenlöserin, mit Hinweis auf den Maler und Angaben zur Kopie in Argentinien

1625 births
1705 deaths
German Baroque painters
Artists from Augsburg